Stepshinsky is a rural locality (a village) in Terebayevskoye Rural Settlement, Nikolsky District, Vologda Oblast, Russia. The population was 41 as of 2002.

Geography 
The distance to Nikolsk is 30 km, to Terebayevo is 14 km. Chyornaya is the nearest rural locality.

References 

Rural localities in Nikolsky District, Vologda Oblast